Scenic design (also known as scenography, stage design, or set design) is the creation of theatrical, as well as film or television scenery.  Scenic designers come from a variety of artistic backgrounds, but in recent years, are mostly trained professionals, holding B.F.A. or M.F.A. degrees in theatre arts. Scenic designers create sets and scenery that aim to support the overall artistic goals of the production. There has been some consideration that scenic design is also production design; however, it is generally considered to be a part of the visual production of a film or television.

Scenic designer 
The scenic designer works with the director and other designers to establish an overall visual concept for the production and design the stage environment. They are responsible for developing a complete set of design drawings that include the following:
basic ground plan showing all stationary and scenic elements.
composite ground plan showing all moving scenic elements, indicating both their onstage and storage positions.
section of the stage space incorporating all elements.
front elevations of every scenic element, and additional elevations or sections of units as required.
All of these required drawing elements can be easily created from one accurate 3-D CAD model of the set design."

In the process of planning, scenic designers often make models, ranging from very basic to extremely complex models. Models are often made before the final drawings that are delivered to the scene shop for construction.

The starting point for a scenic designer is often the question: "How do we generate creative ideas?" A designer will search for evidence through research to produce conceptual ideas that best support the content and values of the design with visual elements. 

It has been argued that the most consuming part of expanding our horizons towards scenic concepts is much more than witnessing creativity and creative people - it begins with us opening our mind to various possibilities. It has been argued that to have an attitude toward learning, seeking, and engaging in creativity, and by willing to be adventurous, inquisitive and curious, the process of scenic design will be greatly benefitted.

The imagination is highly visual. Whether outside or inside, colorful trees or concerts, star lit skies or the architecture of a great building, scenic design is a process of discovery. Discovering what will best clarify and support the setting, environment, atmosphere, ambience, & world that is being created.

Responsibility

The scenic designer is responsible for collaborating with the theatre director and other members of the creative team to create an environment for the production. Scenic designers are responsible for creating scale models of the scenery, renderings, paint elevations and scale construction drawings as part of their communication with other production staff. Communicating the details of the scenic environment to the technical director, production manager, charge scenic artist and prop master are among the most important duties of a scenic designer.

Training
In Europe and Australia, scenic designers take a more holistic approach to theatrical design and will often be responsible not only for scenic design but costume, lighting and sound and are referred to as theatre designers or scenographers or production designers.

Notable set designers 
Notable scenic designers, past and present, include: Adolphe Appia, Boris Aronson, Alexandre Benois, Alison Chitty, Antony McDonald, Barry Kay, Caspar Neher, Cyro Del Nero, Aleksandra Ekster, David Gallo, Edward Gordon Craig, Es Devlin, Ezio Frigerio, Christopher Gibbs, Franco Zeffirelli, George Tsypin, Howard Bay, Inigo Jones, Jean-Pierre Ponnelle, Jo Mielziner, John Lee Beatty, Josef Svoboda, Ken Adam, Léon Bakst, Luciano Damiani, Maria Björnson, Ming Cho Lee, Natalia Goncharova, Nathan Altman, Nicholas Georgiadis, Oliver Smith, Ralph Koltai, Emanuele Luzzati, Neil Patel, Robert Wilson, Russell Patterson, Brian Sidney Bembridge, Santo Loquasto, Sean Kenny, Todd Rosenthal, Robin Wagner, Tony Walton, Louis Daguerre, Ralph Funicello, and Roger Kirk.

See also

Film sculptor
Scenic painting
Scenographer
Scenography
Set construction
Stage machinery
Theatrical scenery

References

Further reading
 Making the Scene: A History of Stage Design and Technology in Europe and the United States by Oscar G. Brockett, Margaret Mitchell, and Linda Hardberger (Tobin Theatre Arts Fund, distributed by University of Texas Press; 2010) 365 pages; traces the history of scene design since the ancient Greeks.
 Designing and Painting for the Theater by Lynn Pecktal.  (McGraw-Hill, 1995 - Performing Arts - 601 pages) Detailing production design for theater, opera, and ballet, Designing and Drawing for the Theater is a foundational text that provides a professional picture and encyclopedic reference of the design process. Well-illustrated with detailed lined drawings and photographs, the book conveys the beauty and craft of scenic and production design.

External links 
 
 Prague Quadrennial of Performance Design and Space - the largest scenography event in the world - presenting contemporary work in a variety of performance design disciplines and genres - costume, stage, light, sound design, and theatre architecture for dance, opera, drama, site specific, multi-media performances, and performance art, etc., Prague, CZ
 What is Scenography Article illustrating the differences between US and European theatre design practices.

 
Design
Theatrical occupations
Stagecraft
Film production